The 2010 Cincinnati Bearcats football team represented the University of Cincinnati as a member of the Big East Conference during the 2010 NCAA Division I FBS football season. Led by first-year head coach Butch Jones, the Bearcats were compiled an overall record of 4–8 with a mark of 2–5 in conference play, placing seventh in the Big East. Cincinnati played six home games at Nippert Stadium and one at Paul Brown Stadium.

Schedule

Game summaries

Fresno State

Indiana State

NC State

Oklahoma

Miami (Ohio)

Louisville

South Florida

Syracuse

West Virginia

Rutgers

Connecticut

Pittsburgh

Awards and milestones

Big East Conference honors

Offensive player of the week
Week 6: Armon Binns

Big East Conference All-Conference First Team

Armon Binns, WR
Zach Collaros, QB

Big East Conference All-Conference Second Team

D.J. Woods, WR
Jason Kelce, OL
Ben Guidugli, TE
Isaiah Pead, RB

J.K. Schaffer, LB

Players in the 2011 NFL Draft

References

Cincinnati
Cincinnati Bearcats football seasons
Cincinnati Bearcats football